Claude G. Lajoie (26 January 1928 – 15 May 2015) was a Liberal party member of the House of Commons of Canada. He was a businessman and building contractor by career.

Born in Trois-Rivières, he represented Quebec's Trois-Rivières electoral district since his victory there in a by-election on 31 May 1971. He was re-elected in the 1972, 1974, 1979 and 1980 federal elections. After serving consecutive terms from the 28th through the 32nd Canadian Parliaments, Lajoie left national politics and did not campaign in the 1984 election.

References 

1928 births
2015 deaths
Members of the House of Commons of Canada from Quebec
Liberal Party of Canada MPs
People from Trois-Rivières